Prateep Chermudhai (born 1923) was a Thai footballer. He competed in the men's tournament at the 1956 Summer Olympics.

References

External links
 

1923 births
Possibly living people
Prateep Chermudhai
Prateep Chermudhai
Prateep Chermudhai
Footballers at the 1956 Summer Olympics
Place of birth missing (living people)
Association football forwards